Resin extraction consists of incising the outer layers of a pine tree in order to collect the sap or resin.

Summary
Resin circulates throughout a coniferous tree and a few others, and serves to seal damage to the tree. Harvesting pine resin dates back to Gallo-Roman times in Gascony.

Tapping pines may either be done so as to sustain the life of the tree, or exhaustively in the years before the tree is cut down.

Traditional tapping
In Gascony, and to a lesser extent in Provence, pine-tapping was practiced as a form of sharecropping, although uncertain status of the workers sometimes led to labor disputes.

Although almost abandoned during the 20th century, in Spain it has experienced something of a resurgence. Cesefor  is a Spanish non-profit foundation. which promotes  forestry in Spain  and its industry including Non-Wood Forest Products (NWFP) which in the Mediterranean region includes, resins, as well as cork berries, nuts, and mushrooms, among many others.

Procedure
Resin is usually collected by causing minor damage to the tree by making a hole far enough into the trunk to puncture the vacuoles, to let sap exit the tree, known as tapping, and then letting the tree repair its damage by filling the wound with resin. This usually takes a few days. Then, excess resin is collected.

Gallery

See also

 Maple syrup
 Rosin
 Rubber tapping
 Turpentine
 Naval stores industry

References

Tree tapping
Conifers